Carr Bank is a small hamlet near Arnside, Cumbria, England. It is in the civil parish of Beetham in South Lakeland local government district.

References

External links

Hamlets in Cumbria
Beetham